GSP Orizont is a semi-submersible, jackup independent leg cantilever drilling rig operated by GSP Drilling, a Grup Servicii Petroliere subsidiary, and currently contracted by Iranian Offshore Engineering and Construction Company for drilling in the Iranian section of the Persian Gulf. The drilling unit is registered in Malta.

Description
GSP Orizont drilling rig was designed by Sonnat Offshore and was built by Petrom at the Galaţi Shipyard in 1982. The rig was completely reconstructed and refurbished in 2010 at a cost of US$50 million. The rig was owned and operated by Petrom from 1982 to 2005 when the company sold its six offshore platforms (including Atlas, Jupiter, Orizont, Prometeu and Saturn) to Grup Servicii Petroliere for US$100 million.

As a drilling rig, GSP Orizont is equipped with advanced drilling equipment and has to meet strict levels of certification under international law. GSP Orizont is able to maneuver with its own engines (to counter drift and ocean currents), but for long-distance relocation it must be moved by specialist tugboats. The rig is capable of withstanding severe sea conditions including  waves and  winds.

Operations
Currently the GSP Orizont is operated by the Iranian company Iranian Offshore Engineering and Construction Company which uses the drilling rig at its Persian Gulf oil and natural gas prospects.

References

External links
Official website

1982 ships
Jack-up rigs
Semi-submersibles
Ships built in Romania